Giovanni Marghinotti (Cagliari, 1798 - Cagliari, 1865) was an Italian painter.

Biography
A major Sardinian painter of the nineteenth century, Giovanni Marghinotti was born in Cagliari in 1798. His artistic training took place in Rome. His works blend the neoclassical-purist taste with the romantic one; specimens of the Marghinotti art are the various portraits of Charles Felix of Sardinia, in particular Carlo Felice munificent protector of the fine arts. There are also several religious-themed paintings, present in various churches in Sardinia. He was welcomed and esteemed even outside the island; he portrayed princes and kings of the Savoy family and was a lecturer at the Accademia Albertina of Turin in 1847.

References

1798 births
1865 deaths
People from Cagliari
18th-century Italian painters
19th-century Italian painters